Jean Gagnon (born November 25, 1956) is a former Canadian-born ice hockey player who played 20 seasons of professional hockey, including six seasons (1980–1986) with HC Fribourg-Gottéron in the Swiss National League A.

Awards and honours

References

External links

1956 births
Canadian ice hockey defencemen
French Quebecers
Ice hockey people from Quebec City
Indianapolis Racers draft picks
Living people
Quebec Remparts players